Alphonsine Agahozo (born 18 October 1997 in Nyarugenge, Kigali) is a Rwandan swimmer. She competed in the Women's 50m freestyle event at the 2012 Summer Olympics in London. Agahozo finished in 58th place and did not advance to the semifinals.

She competed in the women's 50 metre freestyle event at the 2020 Summer Olympics.

References

External links

 

1996 births
Living people
People from Nyarugenge District
Rwandan female swimmers
Commonwealth Games competitors for Rwanda
Swimmers at the 2010 Commonwealth Games
Olympic swimmers of Rwanda
Swimmers at the 2012 Summer Olympics
Swimmers at the 2020 Summer Olympics
Rwandan female freestyle swimmers
Competitors at the 2011 All-Africa Games
African Games competitors for Rwanda